The Human Rights Data Analysis Group is a non-profit, non-partisan organization that applies rigorous science to the analysis of human rights violations around the world. It was founded in 1991 by Patrick Ball. The organization has published findings on conflicts in Syria, 
Colombia, 
Chad, 
Kosovo,
Guatemala,
Peru,
East Timor,
India, Liberia, Bangladesh, and Sierra Leone. The organization provided testimony in the war crimes trials of Slobodan Milošević and Milan Milutinović at the International Criminal Tribunal for the former Yugoslavia, and in Guatemala's Supreme Court in the trial of General José Efraín Ríos Montt, the de facto president of Guatemala in 1982-1983. Gen. Ríos was found guilty of genocide and crimes against humanity.
Most recently, the organization has published on police violence in the United States.

History
The Human Rights Data Analysis Group was founded in December, 1991, by Patrick Ball as a part of the Science and Human Rights Program within the American Association for the Advancement of Science.  It moved to the non-profit umbrella company Benetech on November 3, 2003. On February 1, 2013, HRDAG became an independent nonprofit organization, fiscally sponsored by Community Partners.

References

External links
Human Rights Data Analysis Group (official site)

International human rights organizations
Human rights organizations based in the United States
Organizations established in 1991
Non-profit organizations based in California
Companies based in Palo Alto, California
Free and open-source software organizations
2002 establishments in California
American Association for the Advancement of Science